Colletotrichum dematium is a plant pathogen causing anthracnose.

References

External links

dematium
Fungal plant pathogens and diseases
Fungi described in 1884